Analeptura is a genus of beetles in the family Cerambycidae, containing the following species:

 Analeptura fallax (Say, 1824)
 Analeptura lineola (Say, 1824)

References

Lepturinae